Deua is a national park located in New South Wales, Australia,  south of Sydney, and  east of Canberra. The nearest towns on the coast are Batemans Bay, Moruya and Narooma.

A remote wilderness area of escarpments and gullies, waterfalls, limestone caves, pockets of pinkwood rainforest and outstanding eucalyptus scenery. Deua is an important refuge for plant and animal species, many listed as threatened.

This park is traditionally associated with Aboriginal people.

Flora 

Common eucalyptus species include black ash, monkey gum, messmate and white ash. More rare species include the Jilliga ash and Mongamulla mallee. High altitude rainforests occur in gullies protected from fire. They are dominated by the pinkwood, hard water fern and soft tree fern. Other habitats include swamps, bogs, riverside forest, and rocky scrub.

Fauna 
Over 106 species of birds and 62 types of mammals have been recorded in Deua National Park. Particularly noteworthy is the high diversity of birds of prey, including the peregrine falcon and powerful owl. The caves provide maternity sites for a large variety of bats.

Gallery

See also
 Protected areas of New South Wales

References

National parks of New South Wales
South Coast (New South Wales)
Protected areas established in 1979
1979 establishments in Australia